Hydrelia sericea is a moth in the family Geometridae first described by Arthur Gardiner Butler in 1880. It is found in China, Nepal and the north-eastern Himalayas.

Subspecies
Hydrelia sericea sericea (China, Nepal, north-eastern Himalaya)
Hydrelia sericea pampesia Prout, 1938 (Kashmir)

References

Moths described in 1880
Asthenini
Moths of Asia